Tathiana Garbin and Rita Grande were the defending champions. Garbin did not participate, whilst Grande partnered Emmanuelle Gagliardi, losing in the first round.

The title was won by Cara Black and Elena Likhovtseva who defeated Barbara Schett and Patricia Wartusch in straight sets in the final.

Seeds

Draw

Draw

Qualifying

Seeds

Qualifiers
  Mariana Díaz Oliva /  Vera Zvonareva

Draw

References
Draw

2003 Moorilla Hobart International